Transatel is a telecom corporation headquartered in Paris, La Défense, and led by the founders Jacques Bonifay (CEO) and Bertrand Salomon (Deputy CEO). NTT Communications took a majority stake in the company on 28 February 2019, transferred to NTT Ltd. on 1 July 2019.

Overview 
Founded in 2000, Transatel provides cellular mobile services as a mobile virtual network enabler (MVNE/A) and provider (MVNO). The company operates globally with a cloud-based technical infrastructure in France, in the UK, and in the US.

Transatel is active in three main market segments: 
 Mobile telephony since 2000, as an MVNO (Mobile Virtual Network Operator), MVNE (enabler), or MVNA (aggregator)  
 Machine to Machine (M2M) connectivity, since 2011  
 The Internet of Things (IoT) since 2014, with a focus on cellular embedded connectivity for consumer devices   
It is profitable company, with 70% of revenues generated outside of France.

Management

Jacques Bonifay 
CEO and founder of Transatel, is head of the company's general management, as well as shareholder relationships.

In November 2009, Bonifay became president of Alternative Mobile, the French MVNO association made up of the country's largest MVNOs, where he leads the association's interests in relation to the French government and telecom regulatory authorities.

Bonifay was elected president of EAFM, the European Association of Full MVNOs in October 2012. Now renamed MVNO Europe, the group includes major European operators, such as Liberty Global, Telenet, PosteMobile, Cyta Hellas, Voiceworks, and El Telecom (NRJ Mobile). Jacques guides their European lobbying efforts.
Before founding Transatel, Bonifay had a career in the space industry at Airbus, and afterwards as a consultant for McKinsey & Co. at the Paris office. Jacques later headed Strategy and Business Development for the Professional and Consumer Division of Alcatel, where he initiated new businesses based on fixed mobile convergence and e-commerce with several operators.

Jacques holds an MBA degree from INSEAD and an engineering degree from ENSERG/INPG (Ecole Nationale Supérieure d’Electronique et de Radioélectricité de Grenoble).

Bertrand Salomon 
Bertrand Salomon leads the design of the MVNE platform and the product development roadmap.

He also manages Transatel's relationships with mobile network operators worldwide, as well as the delivery of customized solutions for MVNO or Machine-to-Machine customers. Prior to founding Transatel, Salomon was at Bouygues Telecom France, first as the Manager for New Products and Services, then as Director of the Mobile Internet activity. Before that, he worked for Sagem France, in technical development and project management.

Salomon holds an engineering degree from the Polytechnic School of Lausanne (Switzerland), and an MBA degree from INSEAD (France)1

Activities
Transatel enables mobile services (BtoB) as an MVNE/A or M2M enabler, and provides mobile services (BtoC) through its own MVNOs.

Enabler of mobile services: BtoB activities

MVNE 
In Europe, Transatel enables access to the following MNO networks for voice, SMS and data services
 Orange France  France
 EE (formerly T-Mobile UK and Orange UK)  United Kingdom
 Salt (formerly Orange CH)  Switzerland
 Mobistar (Orange)  Belgium
 Tango  Luxembourg

In addition, Transatel delivers added value services around provisioning, prepaid and post-paid billing, as well as fixed-mobile convergence.

The enabler activity follows two different business models, according to clients' needs: the pure enabler model (MVNE) and the aggregator model (MVNA) for companies wishing to launch and monetize a mobile offer under their brand, be it prepaid or post-paid.

When an MVNO wishes to purchase airtime directly from a Mobile Network Operator (MNO), Transatel acts as the MVNE (MVNO enabler)the technical provider servicing either the MNO or the MVNO.

Transatel's MVNE references include: 
 Life Mobile
 Post Office Mobile
 Now Mobile
 Colruyt Mobile or Ortel

MVNA 
As an MVNA, (MVNO Aggregator) Transatel purchases mobile airtime in bulk from a partner mobile operator, adding the value of its service platform, and wholesales this airtime to multiple MVNOs. Each MVNO in turn sells the mobile service to consumers or companies. The MVNA activity is concentrated in Europe, particularly France, the UK and Switzerland.

Major clients include The People's Operator (TPO), China Telecom Europe, Sewan, Paritel and Netcom.

Machine to Machine connectivity 
In 2011, Transatel entered the Machine to machine (M2M) arena, using its existing MVNE infrastructure across Europe to provide M2M services along similar business models. Transatel enables M2M players to include airtime connectivity to their services, as well as a range of applications, such as fleet and asset tracking, vehicle telematics, smart metering, entertainment, telehealth.

Today, Transatel manages over 1 million SIM cards related to its M2M activity. Its largest client is EE in the UK.

Internet of Things 
In 2014, Transatel launched the concept of global embedded connectivity for consumer electronics with the SIM 901 concept.

Transatel helps consumer device manufacturers deliver global 3G/LTE connectivity through the use of a universal reprogrammable SIM card that can be embedded at manufacturing stage. This SIM card provides connectivity for laptops and tablets at local conditions in 38 countries to date. The service is based on the non-geographic Mobile Network Code MNC 901-37, and made possible through agreements signed in each country with local MNOs. New agreements are signed every month, and should bring the global Transatel footprint to over 60 countries by the end of 2016.
SIM 901 gives the end-user of the device uninterrupted cellular access to the internet when residing or traveling in affiliated countries. For the manufacturer, SIM 901 generates new revenue streams and up-markets the device.

To date, Transatel has signed agreements with three of the top ten worldwide laptop/tablet OEMs, with commercial soft launches planned in Q1 2016 with Windows 10, targeting the consumer and SME segments.

Provider of mobile services: BtoC activities

MVNO 
Precursor to the Eurotariff, and the Digital Single Market Strategy, Transatel has paved the way for low-cost transnational mobile communications, by being the first operator to offer calls to and from other countries within the European Union.

Transatel Mobile was created in 2000 for border dwellers and frequent travelers to solve problems associated with roaming charges applied in France, Switzerland and the Benelux Union. The influx of workers commuting between these geographic locations, paired with their obligation to stay connected, created a need for a mobile connectivity solution. By offering a multi-number SIM card that allows cross-border commuters to place calls at local rates and receive calls for free in four countries, Transatel is able to contribute to the facilitation of trade and the circulation of workers across European borders (Schengen).

In 2010, Transatel decided to address foreign travelers visiting France, and later the European Union, by developing LeFrenchMobile. The creation of the new mobile phone service that allowed Transatel to provide mobile communications on a larger scale by giving students, workers and tourists from around the world the ability to contact their original country while in France or in the European Union.

International travelers depend on mobile apps such as TripAdvisor, Uber and Facebook in addition to placing calls. Travelers need to constantly stay connected the internet.

In April 2015, Transatel created Transatel DataSIM. The brand exclusively offers mobile internet access and allows users to connect to 3G/4G networks in 130 destinations (to date) at local rates. Unlike Transatel's previous offers, Transatel DataSIM was designed to be used throughout the world. To reach the goal of providing global connectivity, the French SME signs new agreements every month with national mobile operators around the world.

Bitebird was launched in June 2016 by Transatel and Air France KLM dedicated to frequent travellers who want to stay connected all over the world. Based on the Transatel 901 system, Bitebird offers a 4G hotspot with a SIM card that can be used at local rates in over 100 destinations.

Research and development 
The following are examples of research and development partnerships that Transatel has developed in recent years:

French R&D 
 MOBISIP: IMS architecture for MVNOs
 SOLIDORE: smartphone / tablet security
 EXOTICUS: IMS experimentation services
 MOBEMO: NFC services for corporate markets

European R&D 
 SEIMONET: transparent mobility between WiMax and 3G 
 EXPESHARE: multimedia expert community

Partnerships 
 Manufacturers: AlcatelLucent, Gemalto, Nokia, NXP
 Laboratories: France Telecom R&D, Fraunhofer, Telecom Sud Paris, Telefónica R&D, University of Rome
 SMEs: Brieftec, Deveryware, Ingelys, Kutalab

Operations 
Transatel's offices around the world either host local teams (160 people in total) or enable the relationship with consumers, in compliance with local tax and legal rules.

Transatel's infrastructure is deployed in several hosting centers: two in Paris, one in London, and since October 2015, one in New York City, in order to address North American device manufacturers and data MVNOs.

Timeline for MVNO launches
2006 Launch of Ten Mobile on the Orange France network
2006 Launch of Telenet Mobile on Belgian network Mobistar, and Calao Mobile and BelSim prepaid offers on Base
2007 Launch of prepaid offer IDT Mobile on the Orange UK network
2007 Start of wholesale packaged offers sold to medium-size MVNO targeting French companies
2007/2008 Launch of ethnic prepaid offers on French Bouygues Telecom network: Mobiho, Budget Mobile / Phenix Mobile, Mankono, Horizon Mobile, ZeMobile, Avantaje
2008 Launch of GlobalCell on the Orange UK network
2010 Launch of EcoNet Wireless (prepaid) on the Orange UK network
2011 Launch of M2M enabler 
2013 Life Mobile launch
2015 Provides service for Post Office mobile

Awards and recognition
 2017 Received Best M2MIoT MVNO Solution at the MVNO World congress
 2015 Received Best MVNA award at the MVNO World congress for three consecutive years  
 2011 Selected as one of ten winners of the Champions du Pôle, an award designated for medium-sized Paris based companies
 2007 Ranked one of the 50 fastest growing companies in France by OSEO-Deloitte

References

Mobile phone companies of France
Privately held companies of France
Mobile virtual network operators